Lot 18 is a township in Prince County, Prince Edward Island, Canada.  It is part of St. David's Parish. Lot 18 was awarded to John Stewart and William Allanby in the 1767 land lottery.

Communities

Incorporated municipalities:

 Malpeque Bay

Civic address communities:

 Baltic
 Burlington
 Clermont
 Darnley
 Hamilton
 Indian River
 Irishtown
 Malpeque
 Margate
 Sea View
 Spring Valley

References

18
Geography of Prince County, Prince Edward Island